The Acadia Axemen and Axewomen are the men's and women's athletic teams that represent Acadia University in Wolfville, Nova Scotia, Canada. The on-campus sports facilities used by Axemen teams include Raymond Field for various field sports and Andrew H. McCain Arena for ice hockey.

Varsity teams
Acadia Axemen teams compete in:
 Basketball (m/w)
 Cross Country Running (w)
 Football (m)
 Ice Hockey (m)
 Rugby (w)
 Soccer (m/w)
 Swimming (m/w)
 Volleyball (w)

Football

The Acadia Axemen football team has been in operation since 1957 and has won 15 conference championships and two national championships.

Ice hockey
The Acadia Axemen ice hockey team has played in the final of the David Johnston University Cup four times, winning the championship in 1993 and 1996:

In addition, two Axemen have been honoured with the Major W.J. ‘Danny’ McLeod award as the University Cup's Most Valuable Player: forward George Dupont in 1993 and forward Greg Clancy in 1996.

References

 
U Sports teams
Kings County, Nova Scotia